The Joint Communiqué of the United States of America and the People's Republic of China, also known as the Shanghai Communiqué (1972), was a diplomatic document issued by the United States of America and the People's Republic of China on February 27, 1972, on the last evening of President Richard Nixon's visit to China.

Background 
National Security Advisor Henry Kissinger was sent to China for secret diplomatic missions in 1971, which included early deliberations over the communiqué and planning for Richard Nixon to visit the country. Premier Zhou Enlai served as the Chinese liaison in the negotiations, with whom Kissinger had 25 hours of documented meetings. Kissinger did not use translators from the State Department due to concerns of leaking.

Kissinger's secret visits involved seven drafts over the contents of the Shanghai Communiqué. Kissinger was initially interested in drafting a communiqué that only mentioned the mutual interests between the United States and China, but Zhou sought to include disagreements between their respective states in order to create a more meaningful document. This move towards an honest representation of relations impressed Kissinger, who increasingly held a favorable view on Chinese leadership.

Further negotiations over the communiqué took place with White House Chief of Staff General Alexander Haig representing the United States while preparing in China a month prior to Nixon's visit. Informed by the Sino-Soviet border conflict, Haig emphasized the border threat that the Soviet Union posed to China and argued that there was a significant mutual interest between the United States and China in information sharing and otherwise militarily countering the Soviet Union. Zhou and Mao Zedong both viewed the remarks as disingenuous and ignorant of Chinese defense capabilities. However, they believed that Haig's statements reflected a genuine desire from the United States for détente.

Nixon's visit 
During the February 1972 visit, the narrative of shared Sino-American interests in counteracting the Soviet Union were repeated numerous times by Nixon and Kissinger. Mao, when updated on Zhou Enlai's meetings with the American delegation, continued to be skeptical of the helpfulness of the security proposals. Zhou was somewhat responsive towards specific offers from Kissinger for aid in early warning detection.

On February 25, disagreements over the contents of the communiqué arose within the American delegation. The communiqué at that point had recognized the security treaties the United States had entered with Japan and South Korea. Then Secretary of State William Rogers and diplomat Marshall Green rejected Nixon and Kissinger's intentional lack of mention of the Sino-American Mutual Defense Treaty signed with Taiwan in 1955, claiming that the absence was a betrayal of a close ally. Working with Qiao Guanhua, Kissinger resolved the disagreement on February 26 by removing all language pertaining to treaties.

The finished communiqué was signed on the evening of February 27, 1972 at the Jinjiang Hotel in Shanghai. Nixon left China the following morning.

Document 
The United States formally acknowledged that "all Chinese on either side of the Taiwan Strait maintain there is but one China". The use of the word "acknowledge" rather than "accept" is often cited as an example of the United States' ambiguous position regarding the future of Taiwan. The communiqué also included wishes to expand the economic and cultural contacts between the two nations, although no concrete steps were mentioned. The communiqué stated that the normalization of relations would contribute "to the relaxation of tension in Asia and the world."

Legacy 

The Shanghai Communiqué represented the United States first diplomatic negotiations with People's Republic of China since its 1949 founding, and were the first official communications with the Communist Party of China since the 1944 to 1947 Dixie Mission.

In a March 1972 visit to Taipei, US diplomat Marshall Green argued to Taiwanese Foreign Minister Chow Shu-Kai that the acceptance of the communiqué represented a change in PRC priorities. Namely, Green argued the communiqué demonstrated that the PRC valued peace with the United States above confrontation with Taiwan, and subsequently increased the security of Taiwan.

The aftermath of the Watergate scandal later in 1972 led Nixon to deprioritize further diplomatic efforts with the PRC.

Relations between the two countries were officially normalized with the Joint Communiqué on the Establishment of Diplomatic Relations. The communique was issued on January 1, 1979, the same day that the Taiwan Relations Act also entered into force.

In a February 2017 opinion piece for The Diplomat, National Committee on U.S.-China Relations president Stephen Orlins praised the Shanghai Communiqué for the cross-Strait stability it offered for Taiwan. Orlins said the communiqué helps ensure confidence with Western investment in Taiwan because of the wide-ranging impacts of the opening of China and continued high-level cross-Strait dialogue.

See also

Ping-pong diplomacy
Three Communiqués
China-United States relations

References

1972 in the United States
1972 in China
Cold War treaties
China–United States relations
Treaties concluded in 1972
Treaties of the People's Republic of China
Treaties of the United States
20th century in Shanghai
February 1972 events in Asia